The 1889 Michigan Wolverines football team represented the University of Michigan in the 1889 college football season. The Wolverines played their home games at Ann Arbor Fairgrounds.

Schedule

Players

Varsity letter winners
Howard Abbott, Minneapolis, Minnesota - quarterback
William D. Ball, Ann Arbor, Michigan - substitute
Benjamin J. Boutwell, Hillsdale, Michigan - center
James E. Duffy, Ann Arbor, Michigan - left halfback
Stephen Clifton Glidden, Glanville, Illinois - right end
George Malcolm Hull, Ypsilanti, Michigan - left guard
Edgar Withrow McPherran, Marquette, Michigan - right halfback
William C. Malley, Chicago, Illinois - right tackle
Horace Prettyman, Bryan, Ohio - left tackle
Horace Burton Strait, Jr., Shakopee, Minnesota - left end
John R. Sutton, Hillsdale, Michigan - substitute at left tackle
David W. Trainer, Jr., Thurlow, Pennsylvania - right guard
James Van Inwagen, Chicago, Illinois - fullback

Others
Archibald Warren Diack
Frank Burton Graves
Harry Samuel Haines
William W. Harless, Chicago, Illinois - rusher
Metcalfe Bradley Hatch
Harry Dwight Smith - quarterback
Clark J. Sutherland, Oxford, Michigan
Horace T. Van Deventer, Knoxville, Tennessee - substitute

Coaching staff
Coach: no coach
Captain: Edgar W. McPherran
Manager: Thomas L. Wilkinson

References

External links
 1889 Football Team -- Bentley Historical Library, University of Michigan Athletics History
 The Chronicle, 1889-1890
 The Michigan Argonaut, 1889-1890

Michigan
Michigan Wolverines football seasons
Michigan Wolverines football